The 2016 NRL Grand Final was a rugby league match between the Melbourne Storm and the Cronulla-Sutherland Sharks to determine the premiers of the National Rugby League for the 2016 season. The match was held at Sydney's ANZ Stadium on Sunday 2 October. Cronulla-Sutherland won the match 14–12 in a tight contest before 83,625 spectators, earning the club its first premiership title in their 49-year history. They also became the last of nine Sydney-based teams to win a premiership. Cronulla forward Luke Lewis was awarded the Clive Churchill Medal as the best player on ground.

The match was preceded by the 2016 National Youth Competition Grand Final and the 2016 NRL State Championship. Pre-match entertainment was headlined by Keith Urban and former Bon Jovi guitarist Richie Sambora with Orianthi. The match was broadcast live throughout in Australia by the Nine Network.

Background
The Melbourne Storm qualified for their sixth grand final in ten years after appearing in the 2006, 2007, 2008, 2009 and 2012 deciders, although their only recognised premiership was in 2012 after their 2007 and 2009 titles were withheld due to systemic salary cap breaches. Only coach Craig Bellamy and halfback Cooper Cronk have been involved on each occasion. The Cronulla-Sutherland Sharks had never won a grand final in the club's preceding 50 seasons, with their last grand final appearance in a unified competition being in 1978 when they lost to the Manly Warringah Sea Eagles through a grand final replay. Cronulla-Sutherland had also appeared in the 1997 Super League grand final, losing to the Brisbane Broncos. The last time Melbourne and Cronulla had faced each other in a finals series was in 2008 when Melbourne denied Cronulla with a decisive 28–0 win to claim a spot against the Manly-Warringah Sea Eagles in the grand final.

2016 season
The Melbourne Storm and the Cronulla-Sutherland Sharks met twice during the regular NRL season; in round 4 and round 26. In round 4, the Cronulla side defeating Melbourne 14–6 at Southern Cross Group Stadium in Cronulla, New South Wales to hand the Storm their first loss of the season; it was also the start of a sixteen-match unbeaten streak for the Sharks. Round 26 was the last round of the regular season before the finals and the game between the two teams would determine who would finish 1st on the NRL ladder and claim the minor premiership. Melbourne would go on to defeat Cronulla-Sutherland 26–6 at their home ground, AAMI Park in Melbourne, Victoria.

Cronulla-Sutherland set the record for the longest winning streak during the 2016 season, winning 15 games in a row from Round 4 to Round 20, whilst also breaking their previous best winning streak of 11 in a row.

In their qualifying finals, Cronulla-Sutherland defeated the Canberra Raiders 16–14 at a capacity GIO Stadium in Canberra, Australian Capital Territory, and the Storm defeated defending premiers the North Queensland Cowboys 16–10 at AAMI Park. As winners of their respective matches, both sides moved directly to the preliminary finals in the third week of the finals series. In the preliminary finals, Cronulla-Sutherland defeated North Queensland 32–20 at Allianz Stadium in Sydney, New South Wales to qualify for their first Grand Final since 1997, while the Melbourne side defeated Canberra 14–12 at AAMI Park to qualify for their sixth Grand Final since 2006.

Teams 

Melbourne Storm halfback Cooper Cronk played in his sixth grand final after having previously featured in every premiership decider his club have reached since 2006. Cronk, Will Chambers, Cameron Smith, Jesse Bromwich, and Kevin Proctor were the last remaining members of their last premiership winning team in 2012. The Cronulla-Sutherland Sharks had six players with previous grand final experience in Luke Lewis (2003), Chris Heighington (2005), Matt Prior (2010), Ben Barba, Michael Ennis (both 2012), and James Maloney (2011 and 2013). Maloney was only the sixth player to contest three grand finals under different clubs after playing for the New Zealand Warriors and the Sydney Roosters in their respective grand final appearances. At age 35 with 278 first grade games, Sharks' captain Paul Gallen was the oldest and most experienced player to debut in a NRL grand final. The grand final would be Michael Ennis' last game before his retirement after playing 273 first grade games in the NRL.

The 2016 NRL Grand Final also marked the Melbourne Storm's 500th NRL game since it entered the competition in 1998.

Officials

Match summary

First half

The Cronulla-Sutherland Sharks opened the scoring in the eighth minute with a penalty goal kicked by James Maloney after Marika Koroibete was penalized for a swinging arm on Chad Townsend. The Cronulla side then scored the first try after a scrum-base move from Paul Gallen sent Ben Barba over in the 15th minute. Maloney converted the goal leaving Cronulla-Sutherland with an 8 - 0 lead.

Despite dominating ball possession and field position, the Cronulla side could not break Melbourne's defence again in the first half and the score remained the same until half-time.

Second half

The Melbourne Storm regained their composure in the second half with tries to Jesse Bromwich and Will Chambers. Both tries were converted by Cameron Smith enabling the Melbourne side to take the lead 12 - 8.

The Cronulla-Sutherland Sharks responded through a try scored by prop Andrew Fifita in which he beat five Melbourne defenders from close range. Maloney again converted the goal leaving the score 14 - 12 to Cronulla with just nine minutes remaining in the match.

The Melbourne club had a prime opportunity to score when Chambers regathered his own grubber after a right-side break but he failed to recognise an unmarked Cooper Cronk. In the final seconds of the game Melbourne again had a chance to steal victory with a play that went from the right side of the field to the left and then back to the right. Cronulla's scrambling defence managed to hold on, with Ricky Leutele making a desperate tackle which secured the club's first ever premiership.

Opening games

Holden Cup NYC Grand Final

NRL State Championship

Aftermath
Cronulla's premiership victory qualified them to take part in the 2017 World Club Series. As runners-up, Melbourne were also set to participate but withdrew from the competition, claiming that travelling to England would hamper their pre-season preparations. The Brisbane Broncos, who finished as semi finalists, was the only other team to accept an invitation, thus reducing the series into a two-game format instead of the intended three games. Playing against the Wigan Warriors, who were the 2016 Super League Champions, Cronulla-Sutherland were defeated 22 – 6.

See also
2016 NRL season
NRL Premiership winners

References

Grand Final
Melbourne Storm matches
North Queensland Cowboys matches
NRL Grand Finals
NRL Grand Final